Fossil Ridge may refer to
Fossil Ridge High School (Fort Worth, Texas)
Fossil Ridge High School (Fort Collins, Colorado)
Fossil Ridge Park in Los Angeles
Fossil Ridge Wilderness in Gunnison County, Colorado
A ridge containing the Walcott Quarry, Yoho National Park, Canada; notable for fossils in the Burgess Shale